William Salter may refer to:

 William Sawtrey (died 1401), also known as William Salter
 William Salter (MP) (died 1404), English politician
 William Salter (artist) (1804–1875), English artist
 William Salter (minister) (1821–1910), Congregational minister in Iowa, USA
 William Charles Salter (1823–1886), English clergyman, Oxford don, and Principal of St Alban Hall
 William Mackintire Salter (1853–1931), philosopher and lecturer for the Ethical Culture Society, Chicago, Illinois, USA